Ethan Gutmann is an American writer, researcher, author, and a senior research fellow in China Studies at the Victims of Communism Memorial Foundation whose work has investigated surveillance and organ harvesting in China.

Education
Gutmann earned a Bachelor of Arts and a Master of International Affairs at Columbia University.

Investigations of China
Gutmann's writing on China includes two books, Losing the New China: A Story of American Commerce, Desire and Betrayal and The Slaughter: Mass Killings, Organ Harvesting, and China's Secret Solution to Its Dissident Problem.

Gutmann has testified before the U.S. Congress, the European Parliament, and the United Nations.

He is a co-founder of the International Coalition to End Transplant Abuse in China and is a China Studies research fellow at the Victims of Communism Memorial Foundation.

Golden Shield surveillance
In 2011, two lawsuits citing Gutmann's work were filed in U.S. federal courts against Cisco Systems, alleging that its technology enabled the government of China to monitor, capture, and kill Chinese adherents of the Falun Gong new religious movement. Evidence of Cisco's activities in China had become public in Gutmann's book Losing the New China: A Story of American Commerce, Desire and Betrayal. In 2014, the federal district court in San Jose dismissed the case, saying the plaintiffs failed to prove that Cisco was aware of its products being used for oppression.

Organ harvesting in China

From 2006, Gutmann wrote articles about organ harvesting. In 2012, "State Organs: Transplant Abuse in China", was published with essays from six medical professionals, David Matas and Gutmann.

Gutmann wrote that he interviewed over 100 witnesses including Falun Gong survivors, doctors, policemen, and camp administrators. He estimated that 65,000 Falun Gong practitioners were killed for their organs from 2000 to 2008, and that between 450,000 and 1 million Falun Gong practitioners were detained at any given time. Gutmann told the Toronto Star  in 2014 that in total "the number of casualties is close to 100,000". An investigation by the Washington Post found evidence undercutting these estimates, quoting Jeremy Chapman and Michael Millis who described  Gutmann's transplant estimates as "not plausible", and stating that estimates by a U.S. congressional commission, the State Department, and the Falun Gong community were all significantly lower than the figures given by Gutmann and others.

Gutmann was one of the key interviewees in Human Harvest, a 2014 Peabody Award winning documentary on organ harvesting in China, as well as the PBS documentary Hard to Believe (2015).

In August 2014, Gutmann wrote The Slaughter: Mass Killings, Organ Harvesting, and China's Secret Solution to Its Dissident Problem, which described China's organ transplant business and its connection with internment camps and killing fields for arrested dissidents, especially the adherents of Falun Gong. The new book, which took seven years, was based on interviews with top-ranking police officials, former prisoners of conscience and Chinese doctors who killed prisoners on the operating table. Gutmann interviewed dissidents including of Falun Gong, Tibetans, Uighurs and House Christians.

In 2016, Gutmann, David Kilgour, and David Matas authored an updated investigative report on China's organ harvesting from prisoners of conscience. The 700-page report contained information on transplant statistics sourced to Chinese hospitals' publications and other Chinese primary sources.

Guttman has said that China is organ harvesting from Uyghurs in its prison camps in the Xinjiang region. In November 2020, Gutmann told Radio Free Asia that a former hospital in Atsu, China, which had been converted into a Xinjiang internment camp, would allow local officials to streamline the organ harvesting process and provide a steady stream of harvested organs from Uyghurs. Gutmann told Haaretz that individuals detained in the Xinjiang internment camps "are being murdered and their organs harvested", that at least 25,000 Uyghurs are killed in Xinjiang for their organs each year, that crematoria have been built throughout the province to dispose of victims' bodies, and that China has created “fast lanes” for the movement of human organs in local airports. Gutmann estimated to Radio Free Asia that 5 to 10 percent of detainees have died each year in the camps.

Controversies in Taiwan

2014 Taipei mayoral election 
During the 2014 Taipei City mayoral election there was controversy about what Gutmann's book, The Slaughter: Mass Killings, Organ Harvesting, and China's Secret Solution to Its Dissident Problem, published in August 2014, said about mayoral candidate Ko Wen-je. Gutmann stated he had not said that Ko was involved in the organ trade and that he might have been misinterpreted. On 27 November, Gutmann released a legal response with lawyer Clive Ansley, stating that "no English-speaking reader to date has understood for one moment that Dr. Ko was acting as an organ broker" and "Mr. Gutmann believes, and we think his book demonstrates, that Dr. Ko has acted honourably".

On 29 November, Ko won the election. A full explanation, including the actual email correspondence where Ko signed off on the story for publication, was provided by Gutmann in December.

2018 Taipei mayoral election
In the 2018 Taipei City mayoral election, there was a controversy regarding Gutmann's book and his statement in 2014. In a news conference in Taipei on 2 October, Gutmann was asked if he had changed his mind about Ko, in which he answered “yes”. Gutmann showed a group photograph of Ko attending a conference on Extracorporeal Membrane Oxygenation training in China and said Ko had told him he knew about organ harvesting of Falun Gong members in 2005, but Gutmann had discovered that the conference took place only three months before he interviewed Ko. “Dr. Ko did not say explicitly what he did in the mainland,” Gutmann said, adding that Ko did not tell him whether he was making money or arranging for patients to receive organ transplants in China. At the end of the news conference, Gutmann said he thought Ko was a liar. He was sued by Ko and was subpoenaed on October 5, 2018.

Views

Falun Gong issues
In 2012 Gutmann stated, "There is a long-standing taboo in the journalism community about Falun Gong, about this issue [organ harvesting]. To touch this issue is the Third Rail of journalism. If you touch it—if you are in Beijing, if you are based in China—you will not be given access to top leaders anymore."

Reception

Books 
Jay Nordlinger, a senior editor of National Review, wrote that Gutmann's 2004 book Losing the New China: A Story of American Commerce, Desire and Betrayal "was about the sordid relationship between the American business community and the Chinese Communist Party. Our businessmen accommodate themselves to the Communist Party, and turn a blind eye to persecution." Sometimes they even assist the persecution, as when Cisco and other technology companies devised special ways to monitor and arrest Falun Gong practitioners".

Nordlinger called Gutmann's 2014 book The Slaughter: Mass Killings, Organ Harvesting, and China's Secret Solution to Its Dissident Problem "another atom bomb".

Books
 Losing the New China: A Story of American Commerce, Desire, and Betrayal, (2004) 
 The Slaughter: Mass Killings, Organ Harvesting and China's Secret Solution to Its Dissident Problem, (2014)

Documentaries
Gutmann appeared in Transmission 6-10 (2009), Red Reign: The Bloody Harvest of China's Prisoners (2013),

Awards
Gutmann's first book Losing the New China won the "Spirit of Tiananmen" award from the Visual Artists Guild, was listed as one of The New York Sun's "Books of the Year" and won the "Chan's Journalism Award".

See also
Adrian Zenz
Edward McMillan-Scott
Arthur Caplan
Dana Rohrabacher
Chris Smith
Ileana Ros-Lehtinen
Organ harvesting from Falun Gong practitioners in China

References

External links

Living people
American human rights activists
American investigative journalists
School of International and Public Affairs, Columbia University alumni
Year of birth missing (living people)